The Dream of Red Mansions (Chinese: 红楼梦) is a 2010 Chinese television series, produced by Han Sanping and directed by Fifth Generation director Li Shaohong. It is a new adaptation of the classic 18th century novel Dream of the Red Chamber.  The series, comprising 50 episodes, made its debut on 6 July 2010 on 9 terrestrial networks across China.

Plot
After her mother succumbs to illness, the sickly Lin Daiyu is sent by her father to her mother's family- the Jia household. She meets her grandmother, cousins, aunts, uncles, and other relatives. Daiyu is shy and delicate, and shares an affinity with her cousin Jia Baoyu. Jia Baoyu grew up surrounded by women, and doesn't take interest in family matters. He has an affair with his maid Hua Xiren, and dreams of several female members of the Jia household, such as Qin Keqing (sister of Baoyu's best friend Qin Zhong). He also acts playfully with his maids Qingwen and Sheyue, and his sisters and cousins Jia Tanchun, Jia Yingchun, Jia Xichun, and Shi Xiangyun.

The Jia family is corrupt, due to Baoyu's older sister Jia Yuanchun being a consort of the Emperor. Jia Yuanchun later visits her family in the Daguanyuan garden in the mansion. The Jia household also has relations with other notable families in Jinling such as the Xue and Wang households. Wang Xifeng is the aunt of Daiyu and Baoyu, and is known for being aggressive and quirky. Wang Xifeng dislikes her husband's concubines and one of them, Second Sister You commits suicide by consuming gold. Xue Baochai is Baoyu and Daiyu's fellow playmate and her brother is known for being a corrupt villain around town. Her brother Xue Pan even kills a man to buy a slave girl named Xiangling. Yet, their mother Aunt Xue doesn't interfere.

Daiyu and Baoyu gradually develop feelings for each other, and Baoyu wishes to marry her. However, his mother Lady Wang, father's mother Grandmother Jia, and other relatives instead choose Xue Baochai as his wife. Daiyu unexpectedly hears this, and falls ill. After the marriage takes place, Daiyu succumbs to grief, and Baoyu becomes disillusioned with his life. At the same time, Baoyu's older sister Yuanchun dies, and the family falls out of favor with the imperial family. Their debt and corruption scandals are known and the Jia household is severely punished. Most of the servants leave and hope is diminished.

Grandmother Jia passes away in front of the whole family after lamenting about the rise and fall of the Jia household. Wang Xifeng miserably dies, and her young daughter Jia Qiaojie is arranged to be sold as a concubine to an old man. To rescue Qiaojie, Xifeng's trusted servant Ping'er gives Qiaojie to Granny Liu- a visitor of the household several years ago. The young girls of the Jia household are forced to marry to wealthier families and suffer their demise. Baoyu leaves the family with two mysterious men who are shown at the beginning of the series. Baochai is left alone with Lady Wang, waiting for the day Baoyu to come back.

Cast 
 Yang Yang as Jia Baoyu
 Yu Xiaotong as young Jia Baoyu
 Jiang Mengjie as Lin Daiyu
 Lin Miaoke as young Lin Daiyu
 Michelle Bai as Xue Baochai
 Li Qin as young Xue Baochai
Yin Yezi as Xue Baoqin
Xu Lu as young Xue Baoqin
 Yao Di as Wang Xifeng
 Yang Mi as Qing Wen
 Zhao Liying as Xing Xiuyan
Huang Xuan as Xue Ke
Song Yi as Xiangling 
 Zhou Caiqin as Grandmother Jia
 Ding Li as Jia Tanchun
 Ma Xiaocan as Shi Xiangyun
 Zhang Di as Jia Yingchun
 Xu Xing as Jia Xichun
 Tang Yifei as Qin Keqing
 Cheng Yuanyuan as Ping'er
 Ye Linlang as Granny Liu
 Li Yan as Xiren
 Gao Liang as Jia Lian
 Gua Ah-leh as Lady Wang
 Wu Xiaodong as Jia Yun
 Yang Junyong as Jia Rong
 Wang Fuli as Lady Xing
 Jia Ni as Lady You
 Gao Yang as Miaoyu
 Cai Feiyun as Yuanyang
 Xu Huanshan as Jia Zheng
 Xuan Lu as Xue Yan
 Kan Qingzi as She Yue

Production
The series was one of the most expensive Chinese TV series ever made at RMB118 million (US$17.55 million). Unlike the 1987 version, this series adapts the Cheng-Gao version.  The 2010 series reproduces large segments of the book's pre-modern Beijing dialogue, often in full. Another feature is its heavy use of a male voice-over reciting much of the book's narrative.

The director was originally slated to be Hu Mei, but Hu clashed with the producers over the cast selection, and was replaced by Li Shaohong in October 2007. The 2010 TV series faced controversy over its cast, the stylized, kunqu-inspired hairdo, as well as a generally negative press after its July 6 debut.

Reception
The 2010 remake was controversial from the start, since the 1987 version was highly acclaimed and few critics were convinced a modern version will match its predecessor.  Following a highly publicized casting call, director Hu Mei was replaced by Li Shaohong in 2007.  Li courted more controversy by adopting a stylized kunqu-inspired hairstyle (dubbed "coined heads" 铜钱头/銅錢頭 (Tóngqián tóu) by netizens) for her female cast members, as advised by Hong Kong art director Ye Jintian.  Many viewers find the hairstyle grotesquely unrealistic.

Response to the series after its debut was mixed, but was largely negative. It was panned by some newspapers, with one referring to it as a pre-modern version of the pop idol drama Meteor Garden. Audience expressed dismay over its use of music, and the use of make-up was also criticized. Some Redologist scholars voiced their disappointment with the somewhat juvenile acting and script adaptation. Director Li was under enormous pressure owing to the negative feedback and broke down during a Beijing press conference held on 7 July 2010, her birthday.

Awards and nominations

References

External links 
 The Dream of Red Mansions, CNTV online complete video, free and legal streaming (Chinese)
 
 Ent.163.com site

Works based on Dream of the Red Chamber
2010 Chinese television series debuts
Television series set in Imperial China
Chinese romance television series
Anhui Television original programming
Beijing Television original programming
Television series by Hualu Baina Film & TV